Walter Ree Holman (born April 6, 1959) is a former American football running back in the National Football League for the Washington Redskins. He also played in the Arena Football League for the Washington Commandos and the Detroit Drive. He played college football at West Virginia State University.

External links
 Just Sports Stats

1959 births
Living people
American football running backs
Detroit Drive players
Holmes Bulldogs football players
Pittsburgh Maulers players
Washington Commandos players
Washington Redskins players
West Virginia State Yellow Jackets football players
People from Vaiden, Mississippi
Players of American football from Mississippi